Gareth Williams (born 27 August 1975) is a former professional tennis player from South Africa.

Biography
Born in Pretoria, Williams was a doubles specialist, who had success as a junior in 1993 when he made three junior grand slam finals. After finishing runner-up at both the French Open and Wimbledon, he and Neville Godwin made a third successive final at the 1993 US Open, defeating the Australian pairing of Ben Ellwood and James Sekulov. He and Godwin also competed in several ATP Tour events, including Durban in 1993, where they made the quarter-finals.

In the mid-1990s he left the professional circuit to play collegiate tennis in the United States at the University of Tulsa (UT).

Graduating from UT with a psychology degree, he returned to the tour and in 2000 reached his best ranking of 179 in the world for doubles. He won a Challenger title in San Antonio in 2000 with Wesley Whitehouse, beating the Bryan brothers in the final. At the 2001 French Open he and Marcos Ondruska featured in the men's doubles main draw and lost in the first round to seventh seeds Ellis Ferreira and Rick Leach.

Junior Grand Slam finals

Doubles: 3 (1 title, 2 runner-ups)

ATP Challenger and ITF Futures finals

Doubles: 14 (9–5)

References

External links
 
 

1975 births
Living people
South African male tennis players
US Open (tennis) junior champions
Tulsa Golden Hurricane men's tennis players
Sportspeople from Pretoria
Grand Slam (tennis) champions in boys' doubles